Antonia Matic (born 31 December 1984) is a former professional German tennis player. Her highest singles ranking is 225 (achieved September 2004) and her highest doubles ranking is 135 (August 2004).
	
Antonia won four doubles titles on the ITF Women's Circuit in her career, and also played on the WTA Tour.
	
She retired from professional tennis, after losing in the second qualifying round of the tournament in Hechingen to Lina Stančiūtė, 4–6, 2–6 in August 2008.

ITF finals

Singles (0–2)

Doubles (4–9)

References
 http://itftennis.com/ProCircuit/players/player/profile.aspx?PlayerID=20013246
 http://www.wtatennis.com/player/antonia-matic_2257889_5664
 

Living people
1984 births
German female tennis players
German people of Romanian descent